Alexander Wheelock Thayer (October 22, 1817 – July 15, 1897) was an American librarian and journalist who became the author of the first scholarly biography of Ludwig van Beethoven, still after many updatings regarded as a standard work of reference on the composer.

Life
In the winter of 1838–39 he was a teacher at the Westfield School in Dedham, Massachusetts.

Originally a librarian at Harvard Law School, Thayer became aware of many discrepancies in the biography of Beethoven by Anton Schindler, Beethoven's sometime amanuensis, which had first appeared in 1840. (Schindler's reliability has since been extensively discussed by later scholars). In 1849 Thayer sailed for Europe to undertake his own researches, learning German and collecting information. Supporting himself by journalism and after many privations, he was eventually appointed US Consul in Trieste, where he was able to pursue his labours. The first edition of the biography, (in German), in three volumes, covering Beethoven's life to 1816, appeared between 1866 and 1879. The work was completed by Thayer's German colleague Hermann Deiters and, after Deiters's death, by Hugo Riemann, who created the posthumously published volumes No. 4 (1907) and No. 5 (1908) from Thayer's notes, covering the years 1817 to Beethoven's death in 1827.

Thayer's work on Beethoven set a benchmark for modern standards of accuracy, research and analysis in biography.

In 1865 Thayer wrote: 
I fight for no theories and cherish no prejudices; my sole point of view is the truth.

Henry Krehbiel, who created the first English edition of the biography in 1921, wrote of Thayer in 1917:
His industry, zeal, keen power of analysis, candor and fair-mindedness won the confidence of all with whom he came into contact except the literary charlatans whose romances he was bent on destroying in the interest of the verities of history.

Krehbiel also penned his own volume four which was published posthumously in 1925.
The most recent version of the biography is revised and edited by Elliot Forbes.

Bibliography
 Thayer, A. W., rev and ed. Elliot Forbes. Thayer's Life of Beethoven. (2 vols.) Princeton: Princeton University Press.

See also

 Thayer family

References

Sources

Thayer's Life of Beethoven, rev. and ed. Elliot Forbes.
Thayer, Alexander Wheelock in Grove Dictionary of Music and Musicians

External links 

 
 
 
  Thayer's Beethoven biography
 Some interesting photos about Thayer  (PowerPoint file)

American biographers
American librarians
1817 births
1897 deaths
Beethoven scholars
Educators from Dedham, Massachusetts
19th-century musicologists